Stromay is a tidal island off North Uist in the Sound of Harris, Scotland.

The low island of Stromay lies between two wide, shallow sea lochs, Loch Mhic Phàil and Loch Aulasary. Stromay is joined to North Uist for most of the tidal cycle.

A smaller islet of the same name lies between Harris and Ensay, and another (Stròmaigh) between North Uist and Kirkibost.

There are extensive sands and rocks offshore that are exposed at low tide.

See also
 List of Outer Hebrides

Footnotes

Islands of the Sound of Harris
Tidal islands of Scotland
Uninhabited islands of the Outer Hebrides